Jacqueline Guadalupe Argüelles Guzmán (born 12 April 1968 in Mexico City) is a Mexican politician affiliated with the Ecologist Green Party of Mexico. As of 2014 she served as Deputy of the LIX Legislature of the Mexican Congress as a plurinominal representative.

Biography 
Jacqueline Argüelles holds a licence in communication sciences from the UNAM. She started her career as a boarding crew member at Aeroméxico.

From September 2003 to August 2006, Jacqueline Argüelles was deputy in charge of investigating Pemex' ecological and social damages.

References

1968 births
Living people
Politicians from Mexico City
Women members of the Chamber of Deputies (Mexico)
Members of the Chamber of Deputies (Mexico)
Ecologist Green Party of Mexico politicians
21st-century Mexican women politicians
21st-century Mexican politicians
National Autonomous University of Mexico alumni
Members of the Congress of Mexico City
Deputies of the LIX Legislature of Mexico